Anton Doboș (born 13 October 1965) is a retired Romanian football defender, who debuted in Divizia A with U Cluj in 1988. He went to Dinamo București in 1989 and helped win one league title before he headed to their rival team Steaua București, where he helped win four league titles.

Doboș made his debut for the national team in 1993, and got 23 caps, the last in 1998. He and was in the squad for the 1998 World Cup and Euro 1996. After Euro 1996 he signed with AEK Athens FC in Greece. He scored one international goal, against Liechtenstein in 1997.

Between 2002 and 2005, Dobos was the president of FCU Politehnica Timişoara, then known as Politehnica AEK – in honour of the Greek club where he spent the last years of his career.

In 2007, he accepted the offer to become U Cluj's president.

On 31 August 2008, Dobos had a serious car accident, which left him in a coma. He recovered after about a day and was again able to communicate with his family. But he remained with loss of memory.
"I am feeling OK now, I am doing my treatment and resting. I haven't fully recovered yet though, I still have memory problems. If I know Lăcătuş? I know him just from what I saw on tape, but I do not recognize him. Only his name. I was also surprised when I learned that I was president of Poli Timișoara and Universitatea Cluj. I don't even remember that I've played football", said Anton Doboș in EVZ.

Honours

Club
Dinamo București
Romanian Championship: 1989–90, 1991–92
Romanian Cup: 1989–90

Steaua București
Romanian Championship: 1992–93, 1993–94, 1994–95, 1995–96
Romanian Cup: 1991–92, 1995–96
Romanian Supercup: 1994, 1995

AEK Athens
Greek Cup: 1996–97
Greek Super Cup: 1996
Greek Superleague Runner-up: 1996–97

References

External links

1965 births
Living people
Romanian footballers
Romania international footballers
People from Sărmașu
AFC Dacia Unirea Brăila players
ACS Sticla Arieșul Turda players
FC Dinamo București players
FC Steaua București players
AEK Athens F.C. players
Ethnikos Piraeus F.C. players
FC Universitatea Cluj players
Association football defenders
UEFA Euro 1996 players
1998 FIFA World Cup players
FC Politehnica Timișoara managers
Expatriate footballers in Greece
Super League Greece players
Liga I players
Romanian expatriate footballers
Romanian expatriate sportspeople in Greece
Romanian football managers